The Ospital ng Maynila Medical Center (Hospital of Manila; abbreviation: OMMC) is a 300-bed non-profit tertiary, general and training hospital in Malate, Manila, Philippines. It is the laboratory hospital of health science students (students of medicine, nursing and physical therapy) enrolled at the Pamantasan ng Lungsod ng Maynila, one of the Philippines' universities. It is also one of the six district hospitals of the City of Manila, catering its 5th district, which consists of Malate, Ermita, Intramuros, Port Area, San Andres, and the southern portion of Paco.

As hospital operated and maintained through the taxes by residents of Manila, OMMC has for its primary concern the admission and treatment of patients who are bona fide residents of the city. Furthermore, it is responsible for the provision of an integrated community health program and research activities.

History

Studies reveal that an alarming number of city residents die without medical attendance. During the year 1967, 16.45% of the total deaths in the city occurred without medical attendance, and 14.43% with incomplete medical attendance. Added to this problem was the fact all the four national hospitals located in the city cannot accommodate all needy patients and even refuse some 8,000 patients a month.

The enactment on June 22, 1957, or Republic Act 1939, otherwise known as the Hospital Financing Act, spurred the City of Manila to establish its own hospital. The law required Manila to contribute 1% of its annual income for the operation and maintenance of national hospitals in the city.

Events leading to the establishment of the city hospital followed rapidly:
 January 11, 1960 – In his inaugural address before the municipal board, Mayor Arsenio Lacson endorsed the hospital project which he said would cost .
 October 11, 1960 – Mayor Lacson issues Executive Order No. 39 creating a city general hospital advisory committee.
 April 11, 1962 – President Diosdado Macapagal issues Presidential Proclamation No. 31 turning over to the City of Manila for hospital purposes the national government property at the corner of Harrison and Roxas Boulevard.
 April 15, 1962 – Immediately upon assumption to office, Mayor Antonio Villegas pushes through the construction of the city hospital in the consonance with his program of “Libreng Pilipino” which hold, among other tings, that the right to medical care is part of the larger and more basic right of the individual to life, liberty and the pursuit of happiness.
 September 11, 1962 – The cornerstone of the city hospital is laid under the auspices of Mayor Villegas.
 October 20, 1962 – At the instance of Mayor Villegas, the municipal board passes Ordinance No. 4636 naming the proposed city general hospital as the Arsenio H. Lacson Memorial Hospital.
 December 18, 1963 – Actual construction work on the hospital building begins.
 December 5, 1968 – Upon the insistent representations of Mayor Lacson’s widow, the municipal board passes Ordinance No. 6807 renaming the hospital as the Ospital ng Maynila.

OMMC was established on January 31, 1969 by the government of the City of Manila. The primary motivation in establishing the Medical Center was to provide city residents, 80% of who are classified as indigents, a better standard of medical care. It was originally planned to provide a total in-patient capacity of 300 beds and 60–90 nursery cribs. In addition, an outpatient department was included to provide medical care to ambulatory patients.

In May 2005, OMMC renovated its Emergency Department, Infirmary Ward and Neonatal Intensive Care Unit (Nursery). Moreover, it also acquired 250 new hospital beds, two incubators, two respirators, and Computed Tomography (CT) Scan services that is free for all legitimate residents of Manila.

On December 23, 2008, the hospital integrated the anthroposophic framework beginning with the institutionalization of integrative and complementary alternative medicine through the help of Dr. Michaela Glocker, who is the leader of the Medical Section at the Goetheanum, the School of Spiritual Science in Dornach, Switzerland since 1988.

On June 24, 2020, a new 10-story New Ospital ng Maynila broke ground, replacing the 51-year-old OMMC building, as announced by Mayor Isko Moreno. The project is part of the platform of the local party Asenso Manileño. On June 24, 2022, the Bagong Ospital ng Maynila was formally opened, led by Moreno. The aforementioned new public hospital has a 384-bed capacity with 52 ward rooms, a total of 25 beds in 12 intensive care units (ICU), 19 private rooms, and six operating rooms. It features four bed elevators, two regular elevators, and two escalators. It also includes three levels of parking space and a helipad at the roof deck. The old OMMC building will be transformed into a new Pamantasan ng Lungsod ng Maynila campus that will house the College of Medicine and Allied Health Services.

Awards and recognition

In 2004, the OMMC Department of Surgery won in the Human Resource and Development category for its Knowledge Management System. The award was presented in ceremonies at the Plaza Athenee Hotel in Bangkok, Thailand, to the hospital director Dr. Christia Padolina and surgery department head Dr. Reynaldo Joson. It bested 166 projects from 55 hospitals in 11 countries, and it is also the first public hospital to win in the Asian Hospital Management Awards. A year later, the OMMC Department of Surgery was awarded 1st Runner-up in the 2005 Asian Corporate Social Responsibility (CSR) Awards for the Best Workplace Practices Category for its Conducive Practice Program for Surgical Residents.

In 2007, the OMMC was the recipient of the prestigious Anvil Awards and received citations in recognition of its Class A medical services and facilities.

Endowment
As the premiere city and training hospital, the OMMC has an annual budget of PhP 253.6 million. In 2008, an additional PhP 30 million was allotted for the hospital to further improve its facilities.

Organizational structure

Departmental organization
The various departments, including both in-patient and out-patient services,
are grouped under 3 major services:

Administrative Services
The Board of Trustees, the governing body of the hospital, formulates all the general policies regarding the operation of the hospital, and recommended, for the Mayor’s consideration, the appointment of hospital staff and personnel, as well as assist in securing additional financial support for the hospital. The members, who are appointees of the mayor, serve on a voluntary basis and not entitled to any remuneration.

The Hospital Administrator, the actual authority for the administration of the hospital, is in direct charge of its management and responsible for the smooth functioning of hospital activities. The administrator is guided by policies determined by the Board and shall coordinate effectively medical, nursing, and administrative services, in order to attain the objectives or goals of the hospitals.

Medical services

Departments
Apart from the Outpatient Services, Medical Services Division is sub-divided into the different departments namely:

Along with the clinical departments the following services were included:

References

Further information
News articles and supplements
Salaverria, Leila. Ospital ng Maynila Patient Care Program bags Award. Inq7.Net. October 9, 2004.
Hospital Management Asia 2004 Winners
Multimedia

Hospital buildings completed in 1969
Hospitals in Manila
Pamantasan ng Lungsod ng Maynila
Hospitals established in 1969
Buildings and structures in Malate, Manila
1969 establishments in the Philippines